Point Lillias is a narrow peninsula jutting southwards from the northern coast of Corio Bay, near the city of Geelong, in Victoria, Australia.  It was formed by a southward trending tongue of lava from the volcanic flows of the Werribee Plains.  The seaward end of the peninsula forms a low cliff fringed by shelly beach ridges.  Forming the end of the same lava tongue 500 m to the south is a small basalt island known as Bird Rock, connected by a submerged shoal to the peninsula. Point Lillias adjoins the evaporation ponds of Cheetham Salt's saltworks at Avalon.  It is listed as a wetland of international importance under the Ramsar Convention as part of the Port Phillip Bay (Western Shoreline) and Bellarine Peninsula Ramsar Site.

Geological significance
Point Lillias illustrates the development of coastal features on a lava surface. Although the adjacent coastline has developed through the submergence of the edge of the Werribee lava plain, Bird Rock is the only emergent, offshore remnant of the lava flows.

Chemical storage issues
Following the 1991 fire in the Coode Island chemicals storage facility in Melbourne, and a long period of inquiry to find an alternative site, in 1996 the Victorian Government recommended Point Lillias as the new site for the transshipment and storage of bulk liquid chemicals for the chemicals industry in Victoria.  The arguments backing the recommendation were accepted by the Australian Government in 1997, and it was proposed to excise 20 ha of the Ramsar site in order to build the new facility.  However, later that year the Victorian Government decided not to proceed with the move from Coode Island to Point Lillias.

References

Notes

Sources
 
 
 

Geography of Geelong
Ramsar sites in Australia
Lillias
Port Phillip